WWE Night of Champions was a professional wrestling event produced by WWE, a Connecticut-based professional wrestling promotion. All nine events aired live and were broadcast on pay-per-view (PPV), while the final two events were also available to livestream on the WWE Network. The inaugural event took place on June 24, 2007, and was a crossover with Vengeance titled Vengeance: Night of Champions. In 2008, Vengeance was dropped in favor of Night of Champions and it took over the June PPV slot. The concept of Night of Champions was that every championship promoted on WWE's main roster from 2007 to 2015 was defended. In 2016, Night of Champions was replaced by the similarly themed Clash of Champions.

To coincide with the original WWE brand extension (2002–2011), the events from 2007 to 2010 featured wrestlers from the Raw and SmackDown brands. The events from 2007 to 2009 also featured the ECW brand before that brand was dissolved in early 2010. During the first brand extension, these three brands were considered WWE's main roster. The first brand extension ended in August 2011.

In total, 10 different WWE championships were defended at Night of Champions over its nine events. Only four of those 10 championships were contested at every event. These were the WWE Championship (called the WWE World Heavyweight Championship at the final two events), the WWE Intercontinental Championship, the WWE United States Championship, and the WWE Tag Team Championship. Coincidentally, these are the only four championships from this time that are still active in WWE, although the WWE Tag Team Championship was renamed to Raw Tag Team Championship in 2016 to coincide with the second brand extension that began that year.

History
Night of Champions was a pay-per-view (PPV) event consisting of a main event and undercard that prominently featured championship matches. It was produced by World Wrestling Entertainment (WWE; the "WWE" acronym became an orphaned initialism for the promotion in 2011). The inaugural event took place on June 24, 2007, under the name Vengeance: Night of Champions at the Toyota Center in Houston, Texas and aired live on PPV—this was a crossover event with Vengeance, which was discontinued in 2008 in favor of Night of Champions (though Vengeance was later reinstated). In the nine editions of Night of Champions, the WWE Championship was defended in the main event seven times (the last two of which it was known as the WWE World Heavyweight Championship), with the now-defunct World Heavyweight Championship defended in the main event once, and in 2011, the main event was a non-championship match. In 2014, Night of Champions became available on WWE's online streaming service, the WWE Network, in addition to traditional PPV. In 2016, Night of Champions was replaced on the PPV schedule by the similarly themed Clash of Champions.

Concept
The concept of Night of Champions was that every championship promoted on WWE's main roster from 2007 to 2015 was defended. Originally, the theme was that every active championship promoted by WWE was defended, but after the establishment of NXT as the promotion's developmental territory in 2012, which introduced its own set of championships, the theme from 2012 onwards was that only WWE's main roster championships were defended. In 2010, non-title matches began to be included on the card as less championships became available due to WWE unifying several titles that eventually led to the dissolution of the first brand extension in August 2011; after the final title unification in December 2013, WWE had just five titles on their main roster through the 2015 event. In total, 10 different WWE championships were defended at the pay-per-view over its nine events.

Notes

Events

See also
 List of current champions in WWE
 List of former championships in WWE

References

External links

 
Recurring events established in 2007
Recurring events disestablished in 2015